Alex Truesdell (born ca 1955) is an American designer and maker, specializing in designs which improve the lives of children with special needs. She received a MacArthur Fellowship in 2015.

Truesdell earned a BS and MEd from Lesley University and a MEd from Boston College. From 1981 to 1998, she worked with the Perkins School for the Blind; she was founder and coordinator for the Assistive Device Center there. She founded the non-profit Adaptive Design Association based in New York City in 2001. Truesdell develops tools and furniture which are low-tech, affordable and adaptable, as well as providing training to others in these techniques.

References

External links 
 

Date of birth missing (living people)
1950s births
Living people
Lesley University alumni
Lynch School of Education and Human Development alumni
MacArthur Fellows
American designers